Fremont is a census-designated place in northwestern Wayne County, Utah, United States. It lies along State Route 72 just northeast of the town of Loa, the county seat of Wayne County. To the north is Fishlake National Forest. The population was 145 at the 2010 census.

Fremont's first permanent settlers were the family of William Wilson Morrell in 1876. The community takes its name from the Fremont River.

Demographics
As of the census of 2010, there were 145 people living in the CDP. There were 96 housing units. The racial makeup of the CDP was 97.9% White, 0.7% Asian, and 1.4% from two or more races. Hispanic or Latino of any race were 2.1% of the population.

See also

 List of census-designated places in Utah

References

External links

Census-designated places in Utah
Census-designated places in Wayne County, Utah